Al Attar Tower can refer to a number of properties developed by the Al Attar Group including:
 Al Attar Business Tower, a Dubai office tower
 Khalid Al Attar Tower 2, a Dubai mixed-use skyscraper
 Gevora Hotel, a Dubai skyscraper hotel previously known as Ahmed Abdul Rahim Al Attar Tower